Yoon Chae-kyung (born July 7, 1996), is a South Korean singer and actress. Yoon began her career with debuted as a member of Puretty under DSP in Japan during 2012 and the group later disbanded in January 2014. Following the disbandment, Yoon appeared as a contestant in the 2014 Kara's reality show for searching a new member Kara Project. She also appeared in the reality show Produce 101 and later in the mockumentary series The God of Music 2 which she became a member of project group C.I.V.A and also joined the fan-made group of Produce 101, I.B.I both respectively in 2016. Yoon later was added as a member of the DSP girl group April in 2017 and  participated in group activities until their disbandment in 2022.

Early life
Yoon Chae-kyung was born on July 7, 1996, in Incheon and grew up in Siheung. She graduated from Eungye Middle School and Hanlim Multi Art School.

Career

2012–14: Puretty and Kara Project

In September 2012, Yoon debuted as a member of DSP Media's Japan-based girl group Puretty, releasing the singles "Cheki Love" in 2012 and "Shwa Shwa Baby" in 2013 for the anime series Pretty Rhythm: Dear My Future. To coincide with the tie-in, the character Chae-kyung, based on her, appeared as part of the main cast. The group disbanded in 2014, with plans for its members to become part of other groups.

In mid-2014, Yoon participated in Kara Project, a reality show in which seven trainees competed to become new members of the girl group Kara.

2016: Produce 101, C.I.V.A and I.B.I

In early 2016, Yoon represented DSP Media on Produce 101, a show where the final 11 contestants formed the girl group I.O.I. In the final episode, she was ranked in 16th place. On May 1, she released a digital single in collaboration with April's Chaewon titled "Clock".

In July 2016, she was cast as a trainee in Mnet's mockumentary series The God of Music 2 with a few other Produce 101 contestants and later formed the project girl group, C.I.V.A, which released the song "Why" featuring Miryo.

In August 2016, she joined LOEN Entertainment's project group IBI. The group released the digital single "Molae Molae" on August 18. On November 11, it was revealed that she would be joining April, following the departure of one of its members.

2017–2022: April

Yoon debuted as a member of April with their third mini-album Prelude and its title track, "April Story", on January 4, 2017. April officially disbanded on January 28, 2022. 

On April 22, 2022, Chaekyung decided to end her contract with DSP Media. Later on April 25, 2022, Yoon signed a contract with Management A.M.9.

Discography

Collaborations

Promotional singles

Filmography

Film

Web series

Television shows

Theater

Notes

References

External links

 

1996 births
Living people
K-pop singers
Kakao M artists
South Korean women pop singers
South Korean contemporary R&B singers
South Korean dance musicians
South Korean female idols
South Korean television personalities
DSP Media artists
Hanlim Multi Art School alumni
Produce 101 contestants
People from Siheung
April (girl group) members
21st-century South Korean women singers
21st-century South Korean singers
Sungshin Women's University alumni
South Korean Roman Catholics